Çədərovtala (also, Cederovtala, Chederentala, and Chederovtala) is a village and municipality in the Balakan Rayon of Azerbaijan.  It has a population of 846.

References 

Populated places in Balakan District